Sittişah Mukrime Hatun ("Keeper or Protector of the Şah'' and "hospitable"; died September 1486), know also as Sitti Hatun, was a Turkish princess, and the first legal wife of Sultan Mehmed the Conqueror of the Ottoman Empire.

Early life
Sittişah Hatun was the daughter of Süleyman Bey, the sixth ruler of Dulkadir State. He is described as a man of unshapely corpulence and pathological sensuality but also as a skillful horseman and the owner of magnificent stables, possessed a considerable army of brave, devoted Turk men and was fabulously wealthy, two circumstances which in themselves sufficed to incline Murad toward the union of his son and heir with this respected noble families which centuries later, though dispossessed of its lands, was still revered as a family of royal blood. The Byzantine chronicler Ducas was convinced, not without reason, that one of the Sultan's chief motives in seeking this marriage was to obtain an ally against the arrogant Karamanids and Jahan Shah, the chief of the Turk men Black Sheep Tribe (Kara Koyunlu).

Marriage

Engagement
When Mehmed turned seventeen, his father decided that he should be married to a woman of inferior station for political purposes. The Sultan's choice fell on the wealthy and beautiful daughters of Süleyman Bey, the sixth ruler of Dulkadir State. It must have been in the winter of 1448-1449 that Murad summoned Çandarlı Halil Pasha, his trusted Grand Vizier, and informed him of the marriage plans. The Sultan declared that he wished the prince to marry and this time as he, Murad, saw fit. Halil Pasha approved wholeheartedly of his master's plan, whereupon they decided to choose one of Süleyman's daughters. The wife of Hizir Pasha, Governor of Amasya, was sent to Elbistan to select the bride in accordance with ancient custom. Her choice fell on Sittişah hatun, the most beautiful of the daughters; the intermediary kissed her eyes and put the engagement ring on the finger.

Wedding
Later the same matron, this time accompanied by Saruca Pasha, the Sultan's favoured adviser in family matters, returned to the court of Elbistan to bring the chosen bride home to Rumelia. The most distinguished nobles of the land escorted the young girl across the mountains to the former Ottoman capital of Bursa, where the judges, the ülema and the sheikhs of the religious orders came to meet her in solemn procession and then onward across the Dardanelles. At the news the cortege was approaching, Murad sent out the grandees of the realm from Edirne to meet his future daughter-in-law, who continued on the Sultan's residence with her imposing retinue.

The wedding took place on 15 December 1449 at Edirne and was celebrated with a great pomp for three months. Popular festivities of all sorts and poetry contests contributed to the rejoicings. The bridegroom, who had not been consulted on the choice of his bride, returned with her to Manisa immediately after the celebration. The marriage is seem to have childless and not very happy. Apparently, the whole arrangement was not to Mehmed's liking.

She was the last woman to legally marry an Ottoman sultan until the marriage between Suleiman the Magnificent and Hürrem Sultan in 1533/1534. 

Due to their shared middle name, Sittişah is sometimes confused with Gülbahar Mükrime Hatun, another consort of Mehmed and mother of his successor Bayezid II.

After the accession to the throne of Bayezid II, son of Mehmed II, one of her nieces, Ayşe Hatun, daughter of her brother, became one of his consorts. As for Sittişah, also Ayşe was confused or exchanged and finally "merged" with Gülbahar Hatun, mother of Selim I, who for a long time was instead considered to be Ayşe's own son.

Death
Long After Mehmed had removed his court to Istanbul, Sittişah Hatun remained behind Edirne, where she lived, lonely and forsaken, until the end of September 1486. She was buried in her mausoleum inside the mosque she had built during the reign of Bayezid II, son of Mehmed and Gülbahar Hatun.

References

Sources

Year of birth unknown
1485 deaths
15th-century consorts of Ottoman sultans
Princesses
Oghuz Turks